The Omega PGA Championship was a professional golf tournament that was held between 1996 and 1999. It was the final stroke play event in each of the first five seasons of the Asian PGA Tour, now known as the Asian Tour, and one of the tours four "majors". It was held twice in 1996, in January and December, to end the 1995 and 1996 seasons.

It was hosted at Clearwater Bay Golf and Country Club in Hong Kong between 1995 and 1998, before moving to Mission Hills Golf Club in Shenzhen, China for 1999.

Winners

References

Former Asian Tour events
Golf tournaments in China
Golf tournaments in Hong Kong
Recurring sporting events established in 1996
Recurring sporting events disestablished in 1999